Variety (Spanish: Varietés) is a 1971 Spanish drama film directed by Juan Antonio Bardem and starring Sara Montiel, Vicente Parra and Chris Avram.

Cast
 Sara Montiel as Ana Marqués  
 Vicente Parra as Miguel Solís 
 Chris Avram as Arturo Robles  
 Trini Alonso as Carmen Soler  
 José María Mompín as Manolo  
 Antonio Ferrandis as D. Antonio  
 Emilio Laguna as Jimmy Fernández  
 Rafael Alonso as Ernesto Sánchez  
 José Morales as Traspunte  
 Miguel del Castillo as Representante  
 Rafael Conesa as Maestro Juanito Blanco  
 Pilar Bardem as Bella ayudante  
 Ramón Centenero as Coreógrafo  
 Santiago Ontañón as Decorador

See also
 Comedians (1954)

References

Bibliography 
 Mira, Alberto. Historical Dictionary of Spanish Cinema. Scarecrow Press, 2010.

External links 
 

1971 films
1971 drama films
Spanish drama films
1970s Spanish-language films
Films directed by Juan Antonio Bardem
Remakes of Spanish films
Musical film remakes
Films scored by Gregorio García Segura
1970s Spanish films